Ashe Mukasa  is an Ivory Coast football forward who played for Ivory Coast in the 1980 African Cup of Nations.

External links
11v11 Profile

Year of birth missing (living people)
Living people
Ivorian footballers
Association football forwards
Ivory Coast international footballers